Goodbye to Goodbye is a 2018 South Korean television series starring Chae Shi-ra, Jo Bo-ah, Lee Sung-jae, and Jun. It is based on the web novel of the same name written by So Jae-won and illustrated by Sal Goo, which was first published in 2017 by Naver. The series aired every Saturday from May 2018 on MBC TV from 8:45 p.m. to 11:10 p.m. (KST), 4 episodes a day.

Synopsis
About two women who came to live together following the betrayals of their partners.

Cast

Main 
 Chae Shi-ra as Seo Young-hee 
A woman who separated from her husband after their affair. She is Han Min Soo's mother.
 Jo Bo-ah as Jung Hyo 
A woman whose boyfriend wants her to have an abortion, and chooses to stay at her boyfriend's mother's house.
Lee Sung-jae as Han Sang-jin
Young-hee's husband who is a pilot.
 Lee Jun-young as Han Min-soo
Young-hee's son and Jung Hyo's boyfriend.

Supporting
Jung Hye-young as Kim Se-young
Jung Woong-in as Jung Soo-chul, Jung Hyo's father 
Yang Hee-kyung as Kim Ok-ja, Kim Se-young's mother
Kim San-ho as Moon Jong-won, Han Sang-jin's workplace junior 
Ha Si-eun as Han Hee-jin, Han Sang-jin's sister 
Oh Ha-nee as Lee Ah-in, Jung Hyo's friend
Yoo Su-bin as Woo Nam-sik, Min-soo's friend
Joel Roberts as Bikilla
Shin Bi as Han Yoo-yeon

Production
Jung Joon-ho was originally cast in the leading role of Han Sang-jin, but left the drama prior to filming due to schedule clashes.
First script reading took place March 30, 2018 at MBC Broadcasting Station in Sangam, South Korea.

Ratings 
 In the table below,  represent the lowest ratings and  represent the highest ratings.
 NR denotes that the drama did not rank in the top 20 daily programs on that date.
 TNmS stop publishing their report from June 2018.

 Episodes 13-16 did not air on June 16 due to coverage of the 2018 FIFA World Cup tournament.

Awards and nominations

Notes

References

External links 
  
 

Korean-language television shows
2018 South Korean television series debuts
MBC TV television dramas
South Korean melodrama television series
Television shows based on South Korean novels
South Korean romance television series
2018 South Korean television series endings